The 1972 New Zealand Grand Prix was a race held at the Pukekohe Park Raceway on 8 January 1972.  The race had 20 starters.

It was the 18th New Zealand Grand Prix, and doubled as the first round of the 1972 Tasman Series.  Australian Frank Gardner won his first NZGP in his McLaren Formula 5000 ahead of British Grand Prix motorcycle racing champion Mike Hailwood. The first New Zealand driver to finish was Robbie Francevic in the McLaren Formula 5000 who came in 9th place.

The race saw the death of Bryan Faloon who died after an accident on the back straight with Graeme Lawrence in the closing laps of the race.

Classification

References

Grand Prix
New Zealand Grand Prix
Tasman Series
January 1972 sports events in New Zealand